Johnny Hayes (born March 10, 1939 or 1940) is an American radio personality and former DJ who worked at Los Angeles radio station KRLA. He began working as a disc jockey in 1961 with stints at major radio stations around the country including Atlanta, San Francisco, and San Diego.

Early years
A native of Macon, Georgia, he served in the Air Force after graduating from high school. To forge a career in radio, he determined to lose his Southern accent and eventually succeeded in doing so.

Career
He has been a disc jockey at major radio stations around the country since 1961, when he joined WAKE in Atlanta. Later gigs in San Francisco and San Diego led to him being hired in 1965 to Los Angeles #1 Top-40 station, KRLA, where he shared the mic with Casey Kasem, Dave Hull, Bob Eubanks, and Dick Biondi.

Hayes was awarded a star on the Hollywood Walk of Fame on May 18, 2000.

References

Year of birth missing (living people)
Living people
People from Macon, Georgia
American radio personalities
American radio DJs